Sérgio Paulo Vieira Pinto (born 8 January 1973) is a Portuguese retired professional footballer who played as a right midfielder.

Club career
After unsuccessfully emerging through local Boavista FC's youth system, Porto-born Pinto played almost exclusively in the lower leagues of his country, representing Ermesinde SC, F.C. Marco, Gondomar SC, C.D. Fátima, S.C. Lamego, C.D. Portosantense, Leça FC, F.C. Maia, F.C. Felgueiras and F.C. Lixa. From 1999 to December 2004 he made 143 Segunda Liga appearances, scoring ten goals.

In a 13-year senior career, Pinto also played one season with Football League First Division club Bradford City, featuring in less than half of the matches as the West Yorkshire side finished just one place above the relegation zone. He retired in June 2005, aged 32.

Personal life
Pinto's older brother, João, was also a footballer. A forward, he played with team and individual success for S.L. Benfica and Sporting CP, also winning more than 80 caps for the Portugal national team. His nephew, Tiago, notably represented Rio Ave F.C.

References

External links

1973 births
Living people
Portuguese footballers
Footballers from Porto
Association football midfielders
Liga Portugal 2 players
Segunda Divisão players
Ermesinde S.C. players
F.C. Marco players
Gondomar S.C. players
C.D. Fátima players
S.C. Lamego players
Leça F.C. players
F.C. Maia players
F.C. Felgueiras players
F.C. Lixa players
English Football League players
Bradford City A.F.C. players
Portuguese expatriate footballers
Expatriate footballers in England
Portuguese expatriate sportspeople in England